The Palace of Universal Happiness is one of the six western palaces and was a residence of imperial concubines. The palace is north of the Palace of Eternal Spring, east of the Palace of Gathering Elegance and southeast of the Palace of Earthly Honour in Beijing, China.

History 
The palace was built in 1420 as "Palace of Peaceful Longevity" and obtained an actual name in 1535. It was renovated in 1683 and in 1897. 

In 1741, when court painters created the series of paintings depicting virtues of ancient imperial consorts, the palace received a painting "Consort Feng Yuan fighting with a bear" symbolising courage.

Although it was mainly reserved for imperial concubines, several emperors lived there occasionally. In 1799, Jiaqing Emperor used the main hall of the palace to mourn his father, Emperor Emeritus Qianlong. In 1850, Xianfeng Emperor mourned his father there. The back hall, Hall of the Alignment with Dao, became a storage of imperial seals for two empress dowagers Ci An and Ci Xi who were acting as regents during the reign of emperors Tongzhi and Guangxu.

The palace has a hip roof covered with yellow glazed tiles and a square layout, similar to the Palace of Great Brilliance on the eastern side of inner court.

Residents

References 

Architecture in China
Forbidden City